This article refers to crime in the U.S. state of Missouri.

Statistics
In 2016 there were 202,193 crimes reported in Missouri, including 537 murders.

Capital punishment laws

Capital punishment is applied in this state.

References

External links